Expedition Unknown is an American reality television series produced by Ping Pong Productions, that follows explorer and television presenter Josh Gates as he investigates mysteries and legends. The series premiered on January 8, 2015 and originally aired on Travel Channel before moving to Discovery Channel in 2018.

History
The program premiered on January 8, 2015, on the Travel Channel. The second season premiered on October 7, 2015, and on March 24, 2016, the Travel Channel renewed the series for a third season, which premiered on November 2, 2016. On March 14, 2017, the Travel Channel renewed the series for a fourth season.

In 2018 at the start of the fifth season, Expedition Unknown moved to Discovery Channel, which became the new home for the series and its spinoffs. The tenth season premiered on May 25, 2022.

In 2020, Josh Gates began hosting Josh Gates Tonight, a talk show spin-off which originated as replacement programming during the COVID-19 pandemic. The series features Gates interviewing celebrity guests via videoconference.

Series overview

Episodes

Season 1 (2015)

Season 2 (2015–16)

Season 3 (2016–17)

Season 4 (2017–18)

Season 5 (2018)
Season 5 started on Tuesday May 29, 2018. The series moved to the Discovery Channel for its 5th season.

Season 6 (2019)

Season 7 (2019)

Season 8 (2020)

Season 9 (2021)

Season 10 (2022)

Extra Finds (2016–17)
Extra Finds episodes involve viewers interacting with Gates.

Hunt for the Yeti (2016)

Hunt for Extraterrestrials (2017)

Search for the Afterlife (2018)

Expedition: Back to the Future (2021) 
In this four-part Discovery+ miniseries, Josh Gates is joined by Back to the Future star Christopher Lloyd as they journey across the U.S. in search of all surviving DMC DeLorean vehicles which were used in the film trilogy. Their mission is to sell a time machine at auction to benefit The Michael J. Fox Foundation.

Aftershows 
After the Hunt is a series of aftershows for Expedition Unknown.

Hunt for Extraterrestrials: After the Hunt (2017)

Expedition Unknown: After the Hunt — Season 6 (2020) 

Season 6 of After the Hunt, aftershows for season 8 of Expedition Unknown

Shark Week Specials

Josh Gates Tonight
Josh Gates Tonight is a spinoff series originally created to fill in the end of season 8 of Expedition Unknown in April 2020 due to the COVID-19 lockdown period. Initially considered part of Expedition Unknown, Josh Gates Tonight later was classified as a separate series. The third season premiered on April 21, 2021.

This talk show features Josh Gates interviewing celebrity guests via videoconference, field segments, comedy bits, and cocktail recipes. At the start of the pandemic, the program was recorded in Gates' home, though production moved to the "Expedition Headquarters" studio starting with episode 14 of the first season.

Season 1 (2020)

Josh Gates Tonight: Shark Week (2020)

Season 2 (2020)
A second season of seven episodes premiered in November 2020.

Season 3 (2021)
The third season premiered in April 2021.

Josh Gates Tonight: Shark Week (2021)

Season 4 (2021)

Season 5 (2022)

Expedition X
On January 15, 2020, it was announced that a spinoff series titled Expedition X would premiere on February 12, 2020 featuring biologist Phil Torres and television host/writer Jessica Chobot. The program is presented by Josh Gates from Expedition HQ, though Gates does not usually accompany the team into the field. Expedition X explores topics that are more explicitly paranormal than those typically covered by Expedition Unknown. While Josh Gates was hosting Josh Gates Tonight in summer 2020, his regular camera crew were filming the second season of Expedition X after the initial COVID-19 lockdown cleared. 

The second season premiered on November 11, 2020. The third season premiered on April 14, 2021. The fourth season premiered on September 1, 2021. The fifth season premiered on May 25, 2022.

Season 1 (2020)

Season 2 (2020)

Season 3 (2021)

Season 4 (2021)

Season 5 (2022)

References

External links
Travel Channel: 
Discovery Channel: 

2010s American reality television series
2020s American reality television series
2015 American television series debuts
Josh Gates Tonight
Adventure travel
American adventure television series
Travel Channel original programming
Discovery Channel original programming